was the twenty-first of the fifty-three stations of the Tōkaidō. It is located in what is now the city of Fujieda, Shizuoka Prefecture, Japan. Between Okabe-juku and the preceding post station of Mariko-juku runs Route 1, which was part of the ancient trade route.

History
Though most post stations along the Tōkaidō were built the first year the route was established; however, Okabe-juku was built one year later in 1602. It only had a population of 16 when it was first established and even by 1638], there were only 100 people in the town, making it a rather small post town; however, it was still able to flourish.

The classic ukiyo-e print by Andō Hiroshige (Hōeidō edition) from 1831–1834 depicts a mountain stream between steep green banks, with the roadway a narrow path walled in on one side by a stone wall.

Okabe-juku's hatago, Kashiba-ya, prospered during the Edo period; however, it was destroyed by fire in 1834. After it was rebuilt in 1836, it was eventually named nationally designated Important Cultural Property. In 2000, it was reopened as an archives museum.

Neighboring post towns
Tōkaidō
Mariko-juku - Okabe-juku - Fujieda-juku

Further reading
Carey, Patrick. Rediscovering the Old Tokaido:In the Footsteps of Hiroshige. Global Books UK (2000). 
Chiba, Reiko. Hiroshige's Tokaido in Prints and Poetry. Tuttle. (1982) 
Taganau, Jilly. The Tokaido Road: Travelling and Representation in Edo and Meiji Japan. RoutledgeCurzon (2004).

References

Stations of the Tōkaidō
Stations of the Tōkaidō in Shizuoka Prefecture